Happy Game is a horror adventure video game developed and published by Amanita Design. The game was released on October 28, 2021 for Microsoft Windows via Steam and the Nintendo Switch console.

Plot
A young boy falls asleep to a horrible nightmare. He must go through three horrible nightmares to become happy once again.

Gameplay
Happy Game is a point and click adventure game reminiscent of previous titles by Amanita Design but much darker. The Player has to get through three worlds while solving various puzzles on their way. The Player also comes across various creatures that can kill them and often has to perform actions quickly to not be killed.

Development
Happy Game was mentioned as an upcoming project of Amanita Design in an interview by Lukáš Kunce in March 2018. Kunce stated it will be similar to Botanicula and Chuchel but darker. Happy Game was in development for 7 years. The game is designed by Jaromír Plachý, creator of Botanicula and Chuchel, while the soundtrack is composed by the band DVA. The game was officially announced on December 15, 2020 during a Nintendo Indie World presentation and it was scheduled to release in Fall 2021. A demo version of the game was released on February 3, 2021 during the Steam Game Festival.

Reception 

Happy Game received generally favorable reviews for PC, according to review aggregator Metacritic.

Review outlets praised the title's art style, score, sound design, and themes, and criticized the unengaging puzzles and clumsy controls.

References

External links

2021 video games
Amanita Design games
Horror video games
Point-and-click adventure games
Video games developed in the Czech Republic
Nintendo Switch games
Windows games
Single-player video games
Video games about nightmares